Emmetsburg Public Library was at a  historic building located in Emmetsburg, Iowa, United States. A former Carnegie library, it sits on the square behind the Palo Alto County Courthouse. Andrew Carnegie had accepted Emmetsburg's application for a grant for $10,000 on February 20, 1911. The building is significant for its architecture. It was designed by Bloomington, Illinois architect A.T. Simmons and completed in 1912. The brick, side gable structure has a projecting entrance on the long side of the building. A string course encircles the building, engaging the lintels of the windows.   The building was listed on the National Register of Historic Places in 1983.

The Library is no longer at this location but attached to the Iowa Lakes Community College.

References

Library buildings completed in 1912
Carnegie libraries in Iowa
Buildings and structures in Palo Alto County, Iowa
Libraries on the National Register of Historic Places in Iowa
National Register of Historic Places in Palo Alto County, Iowa